Calm technology or calm design is a type of information technology where the interaction between the technology and its user is designed to occur in the user's periphery rather than constantly at the center of attention. Information from the technology smoothly shifts to the user's attention when needed but otherwise stays calmly in the user's periphery. Mark Weiser and John Seely Brown describe calm technology as "that which informs but doesn't demand our focus or attention."

The use of calm technology is paired with ubiquitous computing as a way to minimize the perceptible invasiveness of computers in everyday life.

Principles
For a technology to be considered calm technology, there are three core principles it should adhere to:
 
 The user's attention to the technology must reside mainly in the periphery. This means that either the technology can easily shift between the center of attention and the periphery or that much of the information conveyed by the technology is present in the periphery rather than the center.
 The technology increases a user's use of his or her periphery. This creates a pleasant user experience by not overburdening the user with information.
 The technology relays a sense of familiarity to the user and allows awareness of the user's surroundings in the past, present, and future.

History
The phrase "calm technology" was first published in the article "Designing Calm Technology", written by Mark Weiser and John Seely Brown in 1995. The concept had developed amongst researchers at the Xerox Palo Alto Research Center in addition to the concept of ubiquitous computing.

Weiser introduced the concept of calm technology by using the example of LiveWire or "Dangling String". It is an  string connected to the mounted small electric motor in the ceiling. The motor is connected to a nearby Ethernet cable.  When a bit of information flows through that Ethernet cable, it causes a twitch of the motor. The more the information flows, the motor runs faster, thus creating the string to dangle or whirl depending on how much network traffic is. It has aesthetic appeal; it provides a visualization of network traffic but without being obtrusive.

Implementation and examples
Video conferences are an example of calm technology. Information conveyed such as through gestures and facial expressions can be gathered, as opposed to telephone conferences which do not provide this peripheral information.

Smart homes are an extension of calm technology due to their emphasis on awareness and adaptability to the user's needs.

From 2001 to 2003, the EU funded 17 projects under an initiative called "The Disappearing Computer". The goal of this initiative was to explore new concepts and techniques that would lead to the development of calm technologies for people-friendly environments.

Future research
Due to mobile technology trends towards pervasive computing, ambient intelligence, and miniaturization, calm technology is becoming a more integral part of these devices.

Another development of calm technology is its transformation into unattended technology, where the technology always exists in the periphery and never requires central attention from the user.

See also
 Human-centered computing (discipline)
 Human-computer interaction

References

Ubiquitous computing

External links